Cherax, commonly known as yabby/yabbies in Australia, is the most widespread genus of fully aquatic crayfish in the Southern Hemisphere. Various species of cherax may be found in both still and flowing bodies of freshwater across most of Australia and New Guinea. Together with Euastacus, it is also the largest crayfish genus in the Southern Hemisphere.

Habitat
Members of the cherax genus can be found in lakes, rivers, and streams across most of Australia and New Guinea.

The most common and widely distributed species in Australia is the common yabby (C. destructor).  It is generally found in lowland rivers and streams, lakes, swamps, and impoundments at low to medium altitude, largely within the Murray–Darling Basin. Common yabbies are found in many ephemeral waterways, and can survive dry conditions for long periods of time (at least several years) by aestivating (lying dormant) in burrows sunk deep into muddy creek and swamp beds.

In New Guinea, Cherax crayfish are found widely in rivers, streams, and lakes, with a particularly high diversity in the Paniai Lakes. New Guinea is also home to the only known cave-living crayfish in the Southern Hemisphere, C. acherontis.

Introduced
Some species are very colourful and sometimes seen in the freshwater aquarium trade.

Reproduction

The mating season for Cherax is during early spring. After fertilisation, eggs develop inside the mother’s body for 4 to 6 weeks. After that period, the eggs transition to the outside of the mother's body and rest on the female’s tail. Then the eggs continue to develop and hatch in spring.
 
Both sexes of Cherax are selective with copulation partners. Females tend to choose males with a larger central mass (abdomen and tail) and cheliped. Males tend to select copulation partners who have larger body sizes and are virgins. Opposed to females who were more dominant or had symmetrical chelipeds.

As part of a mating/copulation ritual, males and females fight each other. This allows the female to test the strength of the male to determine if they will produce profitable offspring. During the fight both release urine. The female’s release of urine triggers a sexual response from the male. The male's release of urine is an aggressive response towards the fight with the female. When the male smells the female's urine it will stop releasing its own, hoping the female will allow them to copulate.

Once the female has allowed the male to deposit its sperm. The male will position itself on its back and deposit its sperm. Unlike other crayfish species, the Cherax dispar does not use its cheliped to cage females during copulation. It is mainly used during mating when the males and females fight.

Behaviour
In instances when displaying males have chelae of a similar size, they will engage in combat and those with the greater chelae closing force will win.

Female C. dispar uses honest signalling of strength meaning the size of their chelae is a good indication to other C. dispar about that individual's strength. Individuals possessing larger chelae engage in more agonistic encounters and are also more likely to win. In a study of female C. dispar chelae strength, they found that chelae size also indirectly indicated the dominance of the female because of its honest indication of strength.

Species

The genus contains at least 59 species:

Cherax acherontis Patoka, Bláha & Kouba, 2017
Cherax albertisii Nobili, 1899
Cherax albidus Clarke, 1936
Cherax alyciae Lukhaup, Eprilurahman & von Rintelen, 2018
Cherax aruanus Roux, 1911
Cherax austini Coughran & Hobson, 2012
Cherax barretti Clark, 1941
Cherax bicarinatus (Gray, 1845)
Cherax boesemani Lukhaup & Pekny, 2008
Cherax boschmai Holthuis, 1949
Cherax buitendijkae Holthuis, 1949
Cherax cainii Austin, 2002
Cherax cairnsensis Riek, 1969
Cherax cartalacoolah Short, 1993
Cherax cid Coughran & Furse, 2012
Cherax communis Holthuis, 1949
Cherax crassimanus Riek, 1967
Cherax cuspidatus Riek, 1969
Cherax davisi Clark, 1941
Cherax depressus Riek, 1951
Cherax destructor Clark, 1936
Cherax dispar Riek, 1951
Cherax esculus Riek, 1956
Cherax gherardii Patoka, Bláha & Kouba, 2015
Cherax glaber Riek, 1967
Cherax glabrimanus Riek, 1967
Cherax gladstonensis Riek, 1969
Cherax holthuisi Lukhaup & Pekny, 2006
Cherax leckii Coughran, 2005
Cherax longipes Holthuis, 1949
Cherax lorentzi Roux, 1911
Cherax minor Holthuis, 1996
Cherax misolicus Holthuis, 1949
Cherax monticola Holthuis, 1950
Cherax murido Holthuis, 1949
Cherax neocarinatus Riek, 1967
Cherax neopunctatus Riek, 1969
Cherax nucifraga Short, 1991
Cherax pallidus Holthuis, 1949
Cherax paniaicus Holthuis, 1949
Cherax papuanus Holthuis, 1949
Cherax parvus Short & Davie, 1993
Cherax peknyi Lukhaup & Herbert, 2008
Cherax plebejus (Hess, 1865)
Cherax preissii (Erichson, 1846) syn. Cherax angustus McCulloch, 1914 
Cherax pulcher Lukhaup, 2015
Cherax punctatus Clark, 1936
Cherax quadricarinatus (von Martens, 1868)
Cherax quinquecarinatus (Gray, 1845)
Cherax rhynchotus Riek, 1951
Cherax robustus Riek, 1951
Cherax rotundus Clark, 1941
Cherax setosus (Riek, 1951)
Cherax snowden Lukhaup, Panteleit & Schrimpf, 2015 syn. Cherax subterigneus 
Cherax solus Holthuis, 1949
Cherax tenuimanus (Smith, 1912)
Cherax urospinosus Riek, 1969
Cherax wagenknechtae Eprilurahman / Lukhaup, 2022
Cherax wasselli Riek, 1969

References

Parastacidae
Decapod genera